The Corsham School is a large secondary school, with a sixth form, in Corsham, Wiltshire, England. The school has academy status, and as of January 2022 has 1,129 pupils enrolled.

Catchment
Students attend from the market town of Corsham and nearby villages such as Colerne, Neston, Box, Lacock, Shaw and Batheaston; and from more distant places such as the towns of Chippenham and Melksham and the city of Bath.

Layout
The school has five main blocks. It also contains a couple of small buildings. It has two playgrounds and a large field which are used at break time and lunchtime and also for PE lessons. The school also makes use of the facilities of the nearby Springfield Centre including the astroturf pitch, indoor pitch and swimming pool for PE lessons.

 S block or the Science Block – the only three-floored building in the school. Has the school's Science and Computing rooms and also contains the main hall, the canteen, one of the school's two gyms with changing rooms, and several offices.
 T Block or the Technology Block – a building mainly containing Art and DT rooms. Has two fully equipped cooking rooms, two small computer rooms, an English classroom and a Maths classroom.
 R Block or the Richards Block – a two-storey building built in 2003, used for English, Maths and Geography with the Maths classrooms being upstairs, the English classrooms downstairs and the Geography classrooms in an extension to the northwest of the building. Also contains a computer room. It is named after Clive Richards, who taught at the school for a number of years.
 L Block or the Library Block – has the school's main reception, the library, staff room, the reprographics room and the offices of senior staff, including the head teacher's.
 H Block or the Humanities Block – the largest building in the school containing History, RE, PSHE, Modern Foreign Languages, Business Studies, Economics, Psychology and Music classrooms. The two Music classrooms are equipped with pianos and other instruments. There are two Drama studios which are connected to the block with no direct access to the rest of the block from inside them, and a second gym with changing rooms that are in a similar situation to that of the Drama studios. There is also a dance studio.
The newest building in the school, built in 2019 and extended in 2020, is used for the school's sixth form centre and SEND room respectively. It is located opposite H Block.

Academic standards
The Corsham School was described as "exceptional" in increasing the number of pupils attaining top level GCSE grades by Bob Wolfson, Wiltshire's education director, in January 2004. More than two-thirds of Corsham's pupils achieved five or more A* to C grades at GCSE in 2003, a big improvement from just over half the students in 2002.School Standards Minister, David Miliband, announced that he was keen to see the strategy spread to most schools in the country.

In 2009, the school received an 'outstanding' Ofsted report. In December 2012, the school achieved a rating of 'good'. In 2017 it was downgraded to "Requires Improvement". In September 2019, as one of the first schools to be inspected under the revised inspection regime, it was once more rated as 'Good'.

History
The Corsham School opened as a comprehensive school in 1972, replacing Corsham Secondary Modern School which had opened in 1955.

The school specialised as a Visual Arts College until the closure of the Specialist schools programme in 2011.

Student Leaders
The Corsham School is noted for its alternative approach to student leadership. After removing the traditional student council system in 2014, a new system was introduced whereby there are Student Leaders appointed from the sixth form. There are different Student Leader departments (currently: Events, Broadcasting, Publishing, Innovation, Charity & Fundraising) in addition to an Internal and an External Director. In the academic year 2015/6, under the premierships of Oscar Wilson and Ben Hayday, there were over 200 Student Leaders aged 12 to 18.

Some of The Corsham School's Student Leaders' work has included:
 Organising a trip to the Palace of Westminster and a Q&A session with Michelle Donelan MP.
 Supporting Corsham Churches Food Bank with food collections, design competitions and volunteering events.
 Championing students' issues with headteachers, governors, councillors, and Members of Parliament.

House System 
The school has a house system with for houses, Burlington (Blue), Freestone (Yellow), Hazelbury (Green) and Stockwell (Red). These houses compete against each other in competitions such as sports day. Since September 2019, new year sevens coming into the school have been wearing coloured ties which match the colour of the house they're in.

Uniform 
The School uniform consists of: A white shirt, a black blazer with the school logo on it, Black trousers/blue checkered skirt, optional school V-necked jumper and a tie representing the house of the student.

Notable past pupils
 Jessica Decca Aitkenhead, Guardian columnist
 Jennifer Biddall, actress
Darren Eadie, former Premier League and England footballer
Stephanie Millward, Paralympic swimmer
 Caroline Norris, television producer, co-creator and producer of Horrible Histories for CBBC
Gavin Schmidt, NASA climatologist
Joe Sugg, YouTuber
Zoe Sugg, YouTuber and author

References

External links
 

Academies in Wiltshire
Secondary schools in Wiltshire
Corsham